Ukrainian Association of Professional Photographers (UAPP after the Ukrainian name Українська асоціація професійних фотографів) is a free public organization established to represent professional photographers from Ukraine in the international photographic community, to protect their interests and rights at national and international level. One of the goals of the Association is also the certification of professional photographers from Ukraine in compliance with European standards for the purpose.

UAPP is the official representative of the Federation of European Professional Photographers (FEP) in Ukraine. FEP - is an international organization recognized in 31 European countries, as the main representative of the official community of professional photographers in the EU. FEP acting on behalf of more than 50,000 professional photographers from European countries.

UAPP serves as the official representative of its members (general and individual), as well as a mediator in the actions within the professional photographic work.

Association members are winners of international competitions of professional photography (such as "Photographer of the Year-Ukraine", "Best professional photographer in Europe", "International Photography Award"), authors of solo exhibitions, projects and publications. At present 38 members entered the Association.

UAPP partners are the Federation of European Photographers, the National Union of Photographers of Ukraine, the Creative Union "Fotoart", "Unframe" (international group of independent documentary photographers), News Agency "Ukrainian News" and news agency "Mediaport".

UAPP activities include projects aimed at the development of Ukrainian photographic art, spread of photographic knowledge and tutoring, development of cooperation within implementation of photo projects in Ukraine.

External links 
 
 UAPP at the official web-site of the Federation of Professional European Photigraphers

Ukrainian photography organizations
Arts organizations established in 2013
2013 establishments in Ukraine